The Divino Amore Academy (DAA), formerly known as Divine Love High School, is a private sectarian school in Mohon, Talisay City, Cebu, Philippines. The school derives its mission from the apostolate of the Augustinian Sisters of Divine Love (ASDL). Their charism is to dedicate themselves to the education of children and youth and to the teaching of catechism.

History 
Divino Amore Academy (formerly Divine Love High School) is a private sectarian school that derives its mission from the apostolate of the Augustinian Sisters of Divine Love (ASDL).

In 1992, the Augustinian Sisters of Divine Love in the persons of Sr. Rosalia (Andrianella) Mamprin, ASDL and Sr. Sonia Go, ASDL, found an area in Talisay where Secondary Education was needed. The surrounding barangays of Pooc and Mohon were then deprived of a Barangay High School, thus, secondary education was viable only to those who could afford private education. With this, the ASDL saw an opportunity to extend their mission to the concerned residents.

With the Memorandum of Agreement entered into by the Augustinian Sisters of Divine Love with local government officials, the school opened in 1993 for first year students only. The pioneering principal of the institution was Sr. Sonia Go, ASDL, with a total of 92 enrollees.

Since a building was not completely constructed, the students made use of a makeshift wooden classroom and used a bamboo pole for flag raising, with improvised layers of wood as a stage. This effort was supported by the Australian – Filipino Augustinian Solidarity (AFAS) by giving scholarship grants to poor but deserving students of the institution.

The school started with two sections for the first year and teachers were provided from the Department of Education, Culture and Sports. This situation was also true for 1994 where first and second year levels were already opened under the same administrator.

In 1995, the School Principal was Sr. Elena Remolino, ASDL. Another makeshift classroom was constructed to cater for the additional number of students (since a third year level had been opened). Some students were able to use some of the rooms in the 2-storey building of the institution in the latter part of the year. On the first floor, four classrooms were used as well as the principal’s office and the Science Laboratory was opened; in the second floor, another four classrooms were used and the library on the right wing of the building.

In S.Y. 1996-1997 Divino Amore Academy produced its first graduates. The Principal was Sr. Concepcion Lasconia, ASDL. The first graduation ceremony was celebrated in Sto. Niño Mohon Parish Church by Rev. Fr. Dominador Dormiendo. This memorable celebration was blessed with the presence of Hon. Eduardo Gullas who had been very supportive of the institution.

The fifth year of operation (S.Y. 1997-1998) marked the end of the Memorandum of Agreement entered by the ASDL with the local government officials. This year paved way for the 2nd batch of graduates under the same administration.

In S.Y. 1998-1999, the Divino Amore Academy was given the Permit to operate a Complete High School. This time the Multi-Purpose Building was also constructed, where the 1st Graduation Ceremony of Divino Amore Academy was held.

In 1999, the school administrators tapped the assistance of Josrika Training Center for technological competence. The institution started with eight computers with teachers from Josrika Training Center, with the students paying P50.00 as computer laboratory fee. The Computer Laboratory was situated in the second floor of the school building. Another laboratory was also opened during this school year — the T.L.E. Laboratory. It is equipped with 6 unused manually operated sewing machines and 2 display cabinets.

On October 16, 2001, Government Recognition No. 001 Series of 2001 was awarded to Divino Amore Academy as an officially DECS recognized Secondary Education Institution. This happened under the administration of Sr. Concepcion Lasconia, ASDL. The following school year, 2001-2002, another administrator took over the school in the person of Sr. Elena Remolino, ASDL.

Sr. Concepcion Lasconia, ASDL came back for S.Y. 2002-2003 to continue the improvements she started. The tie-up with Josrika Training Center for computer education was done, and the computer units were turned over to the school administration. For S.Y. 2003-2004, Sr. Sarah Geonzon, ASDL took over in running the institution. The following year, Sr. Sarah was sent for a mission to Rome, Italy.

The new administrator from 2004 to 2007 was Sr. Lucila Ferrater. By S.Y. 2005-2006, the administrators converted the Multi-Purpose Building into classrooms for the rising population of enrollees. In this same school year, the DAA Gymnasium was constructed, where the Graduation Ceremony of the same batch took place.

By summer of S.Y. 2006-2007, in answer to the invitation of Fund for Assistance to Private Education (FAPE)’s In-Service Training Seminar, Divino Amore Academy sent five teachers (one for English, Math, Science, Filipino, and Araling Panlipunan) to attend the seminar. As an evaluation, FAPE visited the institution by February 2007 to evaluate teachers’ demonstration on the application and use of FAPE’s Learning Packages.

The result of FAPE’s visit was positive, thereby, gaining the institution a Certification from DepEd and FAPE. With this positive result at hand, the institution continued to practice and implement the standards set forth by the Department of Education.

S.Y. 2007-2008 leaves the Computer Laboratory with 35 computers and three printers, the T.L.E. Laboratory with 18 manually operated sewing machines and one electrically operated sewing machine. Part of the convent will be used for an Audio Visual Room (AVR) which is equipped with a TV set, a laptop and an LCD Projector.

Organizational Plan

Board of Trustees
The Board of Trustees is composed of the Augustinian Sisters of Divine Love. The Board determines the general policies for the administration and development of the institution and bears legal responsibility and authority for its operation.

The Principal
The educational leader of the school and administrative head, responsible for ensuring that the school philosophy, vision, mission, goals and specific objectives are carried out in the best interests of the students and academic community.

Treasurer
The treasurer is the chairperson of the budget and financial transactions and accounting records.

Faculty
The faculty is the group of professional educators who strive to inspire the students to discover and develop their potentials.

Academic non-teaching personnel

 Guidance Counselor
 Librarian
 Registrar

 Cashier
 Health Staff
 Canteen Manager

Official Seal

At the center is a burning flame on an earthen vessel with a cross lifted up on high. This burning flame symbolizes the all – consuming love of God as the center of everything we do. The earthen vessel represents the least of our brethren as the main reason for the school’s existence while the cross is a symbol that the institution carries with it the teachings of the Catholic Church.

The book on the left side stands for the Word of God as seen and observed in its educational services while the praying hands on the right side represents the individuals who are not only skilled and productive, but gospel and value-oriented citizens as well.

All these are enveloped in two circles that signify the vision of the institution which is to build a community where there is fullness of life.

School organizations/clubs

Supreme Student Government (SSG)
Citizenship Advancement Training (CAT)
Campus Journalism
Campus Ministry
Magnificat Choir
Augustinian Youth Ministry (AYM)
Teatro Lamdag
Girl Scout of the Philippines (GSP)
Talisay Junior Drug Watch (TJDW)
Dance Troupe
Healthy Youngster
YES-O
Filipino Club
English Club
AP Club
SciMath Club
Basketball Club
Volleyball Club

Peer Facilitators
Parents Teachers Association (PTA)
Figli del Cardinal Mark Anthony Barbarigo Alumni Association

Other scholarships
Australian-Filipino Augustinian Solidarity (AFAS)
ESC - For top ten Elementary Graduating Class
Italian scholarship
PGMA/Government Student Financial Assistance Program
Student Grantees
The Guillermo Martin Figueroa Foundation

Patron Saints
Our Lady of Assumption is the Patroness of the Augustinian Sisters of Divine Love.Venerable Cardinal Mark Anthony Barbarigo. The school also recognizes St. Augustine, St.Joseph, St. Francis de Sales as part of our devotional practices.

Recognition
The Divino Amore Academy Inc. was originally approved by the Securities and Exchange Commission, Cebu City dated May 28, 1997. Complete transcript of the Articles of Incorporation was issued on May 28, 1997. The Department of Education, Culture and Sports (DECS) granted government recognition for the First to Fourth Year Secondary Curriculum on the 16th day of October, 2000 with a Government recognition No, 001, s. 2001.

References

External links
Official Site 

Catholic elementary schools in the Philippines
Catholic secondary schools in the Philippines
Schools in Metro Cebu
Educational institutions established in 1993
1993 establishments in the Philippines
Education in Talisay, Cebu